Igreja Nossa Senhora do Brasil is a church located in São Paulo, Brazil. It was built in 1940.

External links
 Official site

References

Roman Catholic churches in São Paulo
Roman Catholic churches completed in 1940
20th-century Roman Catholic church buildings in Brazil